The Joseph Gardner House is a historic house in Swansea, Massachusetts.  The original five-bay block of this -story Cape style house was built c. 1795; it was expanded and converted for summer use c. 1877 during the rise of Gardner's Neck as a summer resort area.  The Joseph Gardner, the builder was the grandson of Samuel Gardner, one of the early owners of the neck after its purchase from Native Americans.

The house was listed on the National Register of Historic Places in 1990.

See also
National Register of Historic Places listings in Bristol County, Massachusetts

References

Houses in Bristol County, Massachusetts
Swansea, Massachusetts
Houses on the National Register of Historic Places in Bristol County, Massachusetts